Puberty 2 is the fourth studio album by Japanese-American indie rock singer-songwriter Mitski, released on June 17, 2016, the first release through Dead Oceans. It was produced by longtime collaborator Patrick Hyland. Upon its release, Puberty 2 received widespread acclaim from music critics, with many praising Mitski's emotional delivery and lyrically complex themes, which include longing, love, depression, alienation and racial identity. The album was preceded by the lead single "Your Best American Girl" on March 1, 2016, alongside the announcement of the album, and the second single "Happy" on May 3, 2016. A music video for "A Burning Hill" was released on October 11, 2016, followed by a tour covering North American and Europe.

Background and recording
In a Q&A with Stereogum regarding Puberty 2, Mitski stated that after the breakout indie success of her third studio album, Bury Me at Makeout Creek, she felt out of touch with music, and that she "went back to her roots" in recording Puberty 2 by drawing inspiration from the compositions of all three of her previous studio albums. She also stated that in contrast to her previous album, Bury Me at Makeout Creek, Puberty 2s music would not be made with the intent to be performed live at DIY venues in similar renditions, and instead she would create new renditions of the songs to perform live. The album was recorded entirely in the now-defunct Acme Studios in Westchester, New York, over a two-week period with producer and longtime collaborator Patrick Hyland.

Composition
The New York Times labeled the sound of Puberty 2 as "an impressive collection of D.I.Y. punk and indie rock". According to Jillian Mapes of Pitchfork, Puberty 2s composition contains second-wave emo, "wistful dream pop", "slow-simmering electronics", "brusquely strummed folk-punk", surf guitar, and "plenty of '60s pop hooks". Mapes also noted Mitski's vocal delivery on the album to go through different "modes", including "deadpan disenfranchisement, smooth R&B, dream pop croon, gasping-for-breath pleas, [and] wall of harmonies (with herself)".

Critical reception

Puberty 2 was released to widespread acclaim from music critics. At Metacritic, which assigns a normalized rating out of 100 to reviews from mainstream publications, the album received an average score of 87, based on 22 reviews, indicating "universal acclaim". Critics praised the album's more restrained and nuanced emotional trajectory, as well as its complex lyrical themes, which include longing, love, depression, alienation, and racial identity. Laura Snapes of NPR commented on the album's subtlety, writing that Puberty 2 "is a strike against the happy/sad poles that govern our lives." Katie Rife of The A.V. Club deemed it "a triumphant new step in her evolution".

Accolades

Track listing

Personnel
 Mitski – music, performance, album art
 Patrick Hyland – production, performance, mastering, photographs

Charts

References

External links
 

2016 albums
Dead Oceans albums
Mitski albums